Cid may refer to:

 Cid (Final Fantasy), characters in Final Fantasy video games
- Which Scott Bartlett Loves
 Cid (Star Wars), Trandoshan informant in The Bad Batch
 Cid (soil)
 Cubic inch (c.i.d., cid), a displacement unit for internal combustion engines
 Cid, a slang term for lysergic acid diethylamide (LSD)
 Content-ID, a URI scheme (cid:) that allows the use of MIME within email

People
 El Cid (1043–1099), 11th-century Castilian nobleman
 Cid Corman (1924–2004), poet
 Gérald Cid (born 1983), footballer
Hilda Cid (born 1933), Chilean scientist

See also
 CID (disambiguation)
 El Cid (disambiguation)
 Sid (disambiguation)